Ahu Tuğba (born Tuğba Çetin; August 13, 1955) is a Turkish actress.

Born into a wealthy family of Istanbul, she graduated from Istanbul's American High School for Girls, high school section for girls of Robert College, and attended, but not finished, English language studies at Concordia University in Canada.

She appeared in a brief role in a 1974 film for the first time and she was introduced into the Turkish world of cinema as of the late 1970s. By the early 1980s, she had attained national fame and became a sex symbol, often incarnating libertines, prostitutes or addicts who nevertheless were generally good hearted. She also produced a music album in 1987. Ahu Tuğba married and divorced ten times. She has one child.

Filmografi

References

External links
 

Living people
1955 births
Actresses from Istanbul
Turkish film actresses
20th-century Turkish actresses